Neocheiropteris palmatopedata is a species of fern in the family Polypodiaceae. It is endemic to China.  Its natural habitats are subtropical or tropical dry forests and subtropical or tropical moist lowland forests. It is threatened by habitat loss.

References

Polypodiaceae
Endemic flora of China
Endangered plants
Taxonomy articles created by Polbot
Taxa named by John Gilbert Baker
Taxa named by Konrad H. Christ